Conflict and Conquest in the Islamic World: A Historical Encyclopedia is a two-volume encyclopedia covering the military and political history of Islam, edited by Alexander Mikaberidze and published in 2011.

The encyclopedia  contains more than 600 entries from dozens of contributors, as well as a glossary, maps and photographs.

References

2011 non-fiction books
History books about Islam
Books about military history
Encyclopedias of Islam
Historiography of the early Muslim conquests